Olga Viktorovna Potylitsyna (born 17 September 1989 in Krasnoyarsk) is a Russian skeleton racer who has competed since 2007. Her best Skeleton World Cup finish was first at Igls in November 2011, which was 1st stage of 2011–12 World Cup season. At 2010–11 World Cup season she was 9th at the standings. She competed at the 2014 Winter Olympics in Sochi but was disqualified on 22 November 2017.

References

External links
 

1989 births
Russian female skeleton racers
Living people
Sportspeople from Krasnoyarsk
Skeleton racers at the 2014 Winter Olympics
Olympic skeleton racers of Russia
Russian sportspeople in doping cases
Doping cases in skeleton
20th-century Russian women
21st-century Russian women